The 2007 West Asian Football Federation Championship was held in Jordan's capital Amman. Iran won the final against Iraq 2–1. The 6 entrants were Iraq, Iran, Syria, Palestine, Lebanon and host nation Jordan. The finals took place between 16 and 24 June 2007.

Venue

Group stage

Group A

Group B

Knockout phase

Semi-finals

Final

Champion

External links
 Official Website
 RSSSF Page on the tournament

2007
2007 in Asian football
2007
2006–07 in Jordanian football
2006–07 in Iranian football
2006–07 in Iraqi football
2006–07 in Syrian football
2006–07 in Lebanese football
2007 in Palestinian football